Cartier Island is an uninhabited and unvegetated sand cay in a platform reef in the Timor Sea north of Australia and south of Indonesia. It is within the Territory of Ashmore and Cartier Islands, an external territory of Australia.

At the southern edge of the reef is a shipwreck of the Ann Millicent, an iron-hulled barge of 944 tons wrecked in 1888. The remains of an RAAF Beaufighter can also be seen at low tide. Formerly used as a bombing range, access to the island is prohibited because of the risk of unexploded ordnances. The area is still a gazetted Defence Practice Area, but is no longer in active use.

Cartier Island is completely unvegetated except for the seagrass Thalassia hemprichii, which grows in pockets of sand within the reef, and may be exposed at low tide.

History
The island was charted in 1800 and named after the ship Cartier. Its charted position was somewhat inaccurate until corrected in 1878 during a hydrographic survey by Lieutenant William Tooker in the Airlie. On 5 January 1888 the Ann Millicent was wrecked on the island during a voyage from the Gulf of Carpentaria to Adelaide, South Australia. In 1909 it was annexed by the United Kingdom, but on 23 July 1931 both Ashmore Reef and Cartier Island were transferred to Australia.

During World War II the area was used as a bombing range. Cartier Island and the surrounding marine area within a  radius was a gazetted Defence Practice Area up to 20 July 2011 and has been used in the past as an air weapons range. Although the site is no longer an active weapons range there is a substantial risk that unexploded ordnances remain in the area.

Cartier Island is within an area subject to a Memorandum of Understanding (known as the MOU Box) signed by Australia and Indonesia in 1974 and reviewed in 1989, which provided for continued Indonesian traditional fishing within limits.

Environment and protection
The Cartier Island Marine Park covers an area within  of the centre of the reef is protected as a Sanctuary Zone (IUCN Ia).

In 2003, environmental authorities closed maritime access to the island and its surrounding reef to build up depleted fish stocks and for safety reasons. Announced as a seven-year closure, Environment Australia planned to monitor levels of marine wildlife, and determine the presence of unexploded ordnance. Prior to that time, the area was frequented by yachts, and fished by Indonesian boats.

References

Sources
 Cartier Island at the Gazetteer of Australia online
 Ashmore and Cartier Islands at CIA - The World Factbook

Ashmore and Cartier Islands
Uninhabited islands of Australia